Teuvo Hatunen (20 August 1944 – 15 December 2010) was a Finnish cross-country skier. He competed in the men's 30 kilometre event at the 1972 Winter Olympics.

Cross-country skiing results

Olympic Games

References

External links
 

1944 births
2010 deaths
Finnish male cross-country skiers
Olympic cross-country skiers of Finland
Cross-country skiers at the 1972 Winter Olympics
People from Haapavesi
Sportspeople from North Ostrobothnia
20th-century Finnish people